Bevil Oaks is a city in Jefferson County, Texas, United States. The population was 1,274 at the 2010 census. It is part of the Beaumont–Port Arthur Metropolitan Statistical Area.

Geography

Bevil Oaks is located along the northern edge of Jefferson County at  (30.151695, –94.268336). It is bordered to the north and west by Pine Island Bayou, which forms the Hardin County line. Texas State Highway 105 forms the southern boundary of the city; SH 105 leads west  to Sour Lake and east  to U.S. Route 96.

History

Bevil Oaks was formed from the sub-divisions of Bevil Acres and River Oaks sometimes prior to the 1963 incorporation. The economy is largely dependent on that of the Golden Triangle.

Demographics

As of the census of 2000, there were 1,346 people, 521 households, and 432 families residing in the city. The population density was 640.2 people per square mile (247.5/km2). There were 552 housing units at an average density of 262.6 per square mile (101.5/km2). The racial makeup of the city was 96.36% White, 2.01% African American, 0.15% Asian, 0.97% from other races, and 0.52% from two or more races. Hispanic or Latino of any race were 3.12% of the population.

There were 521 households, out of which 29.2% had children under the age of 18 living with them, 72.4% were married couples living together, 8.4% had a female householder with no husband present, and 16.9% were non-families. 14.6% of all households were made up of individuals, and 6.1% had someone living alone who was 65 years of age or older. The average household size was 2.58 and the average family size was 2.83.

In the city, the population was spread out, with 20.4% under the age of 18, 8.2% from 18 to 24, 22.7% from 25 to 44, 32.9% from 45 to 64, and 15.8% who were 65 years of age or older. The median age was 44 years. For every 100 females, there were 103.3 males. For every 100 females age 18 and over, there were 97.6 males.

The median income for a household in the city was $55,982, and the median income for a family was $59,375. Males had a median income of $47,596 versus $23,906 for females. The per capita income for the city was $26,273. About 2.0% of families and 4.3% of the population were below the poverty line, including 6.3% of those under age 18 and 4.0% of those age 65 or over.

Education 
From its inception until 2018, Bevil Oaks was served by the Beaumont Independent School District. However, on March 5, 2018, Mike Morath, the Texas Commissioner of Education, signed an order granting detachment from Beaumont ISD and annexation into Hardin-Jefferson Independent School District.  Citizens of Bevil Oaks presented a petition for detachment to Beaumont ISD on April 20, 2017.  The same petition requesting annexation was presented to Hardin-Jefferson ISD on May 1, 2017.  Beaumont ISD denied the citizens' request, where H-J ISD gave their approval.  A subsequent appeal was filed by the citizens with the Texas Education Agency on June 23, 2017.  An Administrative Law Judge in Austin ruled in December 2017 that the citizens' request for detachment was legal.   Beaumont ISD reached an agreement with petitioners the week of March 5, 2018 that ultimately granted detachment of the small community.

Effective July 1, 2018, the city of Bevil Oaks will be served by the Hardin-Jefferson Independent School District.

Law enforcement 
As of 2011, Bevil Oaks is served by the Jefferson County Sheriff's Office. Until 2011, Bevil Oaks was served by a City Marshal. Once an elected position that began around 1967 it was converted to an appointed position in 1983. The first and only elected City Marshal was Herman Ritchie, who served from 1967 to 1983. Larry K. Arnold was the first appointed City Marshal and served from 1983 to 1985.

References

External links
City of Bevil Oaks official website

Cities in Texas
Cities in Jefferson County, Texas
Cities in the Beaumont–Port Arthur metropolitan area